The Gibson Code is a constructed language invented by Manly B. Gibson of the United States Army Coastal Artillery, which replaces words with numbers using the digits 0-9.

References 

 Science News Online: World figure code
 Wired: Dejpu'bogh Hov rur qablli!

Engineered languages
Constructed languages introduced in the 20th century